Sous le soleil (Under the sun) is a French soap opera broadcast on French major channel TF1 from 1996 to 2008. A spin-off, Sous le soleil de Saint-Tropez has been broadcast in French channel TMC since 2013.

Broadcast
It has been a success in many countries, particularly in Latin America, France, Belgium, Bulgaria, Switzerland, Italy, Slovakia, Russia, Turkey and Poland. In different times it was also shown in Hungary, Ukraine, Lebanon, Azerbaijan, Georgia, Greece, Estonia, Finland, Sweden, Denmark, Mexico, Bosnia and Herzegovina, Serbia, USA and many other countries. In Serbia, the show has been on air continuously since 1998 on several different channels; as of 2009, the show is being syndicated in its entirety on several local television channels. In Montenegro (as well as in Serbia through cable), new episodes are being shown on Atlas TV.

Plot and characters
The plot focuses on the lives and romances of Laure, Caroline and Jessica, three young women living in Saint-Tropez, on the French Riviera. 
Laure is a sensitive woman working as a doctor in a hospital of Saint-Tropez. 
Caroline is a willful and smart woman who works hard to make it as a singer and a lawyer. 
Jessica is a beautiful American blonde who works as a bartender, a model and a dancer.

Cast
 Bénédicte Delmas as Laure Olivier (243 episodes)
 Adeline Blondieau as Caroline Drancourt (207 episodes)
 Tonya Kinzinger as Jessica Lowry (344 Episodes)
 Marie-Christine Adam as Blandine Olivier (150 Episodes)
 Grégory Fitoussi as Benjamin (62 Episodes)
 Lucie Jeanne as Victoria (34 Episodes)
 Arnaud Binard as Manu (18 Episodes)
 Claude Gensac as Aunt Clarissa (4 Episodes)
 Yoann Sover as Fabrice (season 6)

Guest
 Agnès Soral as Lise Hamon
 Alice Pol as Chloé
 Babsie Steger as Sylviane
 Delphine Chanéac as Charlotte Lacroix
 Jean Dell as Lawyer Belgrand
 Lucien Jean-Baptiste as Bob Robin

Music 
The Sous Le Soleil (Theme Song) is by Avy Marciano.

See also
 List of French television series

External links
 Sous le soleil on imdb
 Official website 
 Fans website

1996 French television series debuts
2008 French television series endings
French television soap operas
1990s French television series
Television shows set in France
TF1 original programming